Richard Watkins (by 1507 – 1550), of London and Hunstrete, Somerset was an English politician.

He was a Member (MP) of the Parliament of England for Bramber in 1542 and for Bridport in 1545.

References

Year of birth uncertain
1550 deaths
Politicians from London
Politicians from Somerset
People from Bath and North East Somerset
English MPs 1542–1544
English MPs 1545–1547